The Danube–Oder Canal is a planned and partially constructed artificial waterway in the Lobau floodplain of the Danube at Vienna, that was supposed to stretch along the Morava River to the Oder at the city of Kędzierzyn-Koźle in Poland.

Overview 

The Holy Roman Emperor Charles IV had envisioned a waterway capable of taking ships from the Oder to the Danube in the 14th century. Records of further plans of such a waterway stem from the 19th century. During the Nazi era, the idea was reborn and the project was put into motion. The project would connect the Oder to the Danube through the Moravian region of the Czech Republic, stretching 320 kilometers and spanning an elevation of 124 meters.

On December 8, 1939 Rudolf Hess inaugurated the then-named Adolf Hitler Canal, today Gliwice Canal (Polish: Kanał Gliwicki) from Kędzierzyn-Koźle at the Oder River to the city of Gliwice, that replaced the historic Kłodnica Canal finished in 1812. At the same time, Hess also performed the groundbreaking ceremony for the further Donau-Oder-Kanal. The work on the Upper Silesian side already discontinued in 1940. Only a few kilometres of the planned 40-km long channel from Vienna to Angern at the Morava River were actually dug in the years up to 1943, mainly in the areas around the Lobau floodplain in the Donaustadt district of Vienna and the adjacent town of Groß-Enzersdorf. The branch-off at the Danube, just under 100 meters long, is still clearly recognizable today, connecting the Ölhafen Lobau of the OMV oil company. Two further sections are today used for swimming and fishing.

Between 1964 and 1970, a part of the original plans gained attention from Poland again and an offshoot of the Gliwice Canal was constructed. The short, finished arm east of Kędzierzyn-Koźle is known as Kanal Kędzierzynski and serves to connect the nitrogen factory Azoty Kędzierzyn AG to the Oder.

The waterway today is again part of plans for a European Danube–Oder–Elbe Canal project that would also connect the Elbe river.

Gallery

References

External links
  Danube-Oder-Elbe water corridor website

Proposed canals
Geography of Vienna
Canals in Poland
Canals in Austria
Canals in Germany
Canals in the Czech Republic
International canals
Proposed transport infrastructure in Poland
Canals opened in 1939